Sir Thomas Farrell (1827 – 2 July 1900), was an Irish sculptor.

He was born in Mecklenburgh Street (later called Railway Street) in Summerhill, Dublin, one of six sons of Terence Farrell, sculptor. He trained as a sculptor in his father's workshops. In 1842 he entered the modelling school of the Royal Dublin Society and became acquainted with the neoclassical school of John Flaxmann and John Hogan. His first commission was a monument to Archbishop Daniel Murray in the Pro-Cathedral.

One of the first works that made him prominent was the bas-relief representing the last charge at Waterloo, designed for the Wellington Monument in the Phoenix Park. His work was accepted after public competition. Another of his early works was his memorial to Captain John McNeil Boyd in St. Patrick's Cathedral. He entered the competition for the monument to Daniel O'Connell in 1864, but the commission was awarded to John Foley.

His statue of William Smith O'Brien, the Young Ireland leader, formerly at the head of D'Olier Street, is now in O'Connell Street, as is another statue by him, that of Sir John Gray, the surgeon and politician who was instrumental in giving Dublin its water supply.

In 1893, Farrell was elected President of the Royal Hibernian Academy, and the following year he was knighted. He died at his residence, Redesdale House, in Stillorgan, County Dublin.

References

1827 births
1900 deaths
Irish sculptors
Artists from Dublin (city)
19th-century sculptors